Ari Ólafsson (born 21 May 1998) is an Icelandic singer who represented his country in the Eurovision Song Contest 2018 with the song "Our Choice" which ended 19th in Semi Final 1 with 15 points. Ólafsson has graduated from the Royal Academy of Music in London with a degree in opera and is now pursuing a career in musical theatre.

References

{{DEFAULTSORT:Olafsson, Ari]}}
1998 births
Living people
Ari Olafsson
Ari Olafsson
Ari Olafsson
Eurovision Song Contest entrants of 2018